John Johnston may refer to:

Entertainment
 John Johnston (poet) (c. 1570–1611), Scottish poet and academic
 John S. Johnston (c. 1839–1899), American maritime photographer
 Johnnie Johnston (1915–1996), American actor and singer
 John Dennis Johnston (born 1945), American actor

Politics
 John W. Johnston (mayor) (1774–1854), St. Louis, Missouri, US
 John Johnston (Indian agent) (1775–1861), US
 John Johnston (Nova Scotia politician) (1790–1836)
 John Johnston (New Zealand politician) (1809–1887)
 John W. Johnston (1818–1889), senator from Virginia, US
 John Johnston (Australian politician) (1823–1872)
 John R. Johnston (died 1863), mayor of Hoboken, New Jersey, US
 John Kenneth Johnston (1865–1945), Canadian politician
 John Frederick Johnston (1876–1948), Canadian politician
 John B. Johnston (1882–1960), U.S. Representative
 John Stewart Johnston (1905/6–?), Northern Irish politician
 John Baines Johnston (1918–2005), British diplomat
 John Johnston (courtier) (1922–2006), UK
 J. Bennett Johnston (born 1932), U.S. Senator

Sports
 John Johnston (footballer, born 1878) (1876–1955), Scottish footballer (Bury FC, Southampton FC)
 John Johnston (football full-back), footballer for Sunderland
 John Johnston (footballer, born 1902) (1902–1987), Scottish international footballer
 John Johnston (footballer, born 1921) (1921–1989), Scottish footballer (Motherwell FC, Hamilton Academical)
 Johnny Johnston (baseball) (1890–1940), American baseball player
 Johnny Johnston (cricketer) (1953–2008), English cricketer
 Johnny Johnston (footballer) (born 1947), Northern Irish footballer

Other
 Sir John Johnston, 3rd Baronet (c. 1648–1690), Scottish soldier
 John Johnston (chemist) (1881–1950), Scottish-born chemist
 John Johnson (architect, born 1732) (1732–1814) English architect
 John Johnston (fur trader) (1762–1828), British
 John Johnston (merchant) (1781–1851), Scottish-American merchant
 John Johnston (farmer) (1791–1880), Scotland
 John Taylor Johnston (1820–1893), founder of the Metropolitan Museum of Art
 John R. Johnston (1826–1895), landscape and panorama painter
 John Lawson Johnston (1839–1900), Scottish businessman
 John Johnston (priest) (1852–1923), Anglican clergyman
John Johnston (schoolmaster) (1871– 1938), a British educator 
 John McQueen Johnston (1901–1987), Scottish physician
 John Johnston (econometrician) (1923–2003), British academic
 John V. Johnston (died 1912), U.S. Navy officer
 John Johnston (physiotherapist), Scottish-born Australian physiotherapist
 John Johnston, 13-year-old boy murdered in 1923 by Susan Newell in Coatbridge, Scotland
 Johnny Johnston of The Johnston Brothers

See also
 John Jonston (1603–1675), Polish scholar, physician, naturalist, botanist, and entomologist
 John Johnson (disambiguation)
 John Johnstone (disambiguation)
 Johnnie or Johnny Johnston (disambiguation)